Rosetta LeNoire (born Rosetta Olive Burton; August 8, 1911 – March 17, 2002) was an American stage, film, and television actress. She was known to contemporary audiences for her work in television. She had regular roles on such series as Gimme a Break! and Amen, and is likely best-known for her role as Estelle "Mother" Winslow on Family Matters. In 1999, she was awarded the National Medal of Arts.

Early life and career
Lenoire was born in Harlem, New York City, as the eldest of 5 children to Harold Burton, who was from Dominica, and Nymarie Edith Jacques Helwig, of Jamaica in the West Indies. As a young girl, LeNoire suffered from rickets, which her godfather Bill "Bojangles" Robinson helped her overcome by teaching her to dance. Stage theater was her first love, and LeNoire performed in the Federal Theater Project's Bassa Moona and was cast as a witch in Orson Welles' 1936 production of Macbeth. 

She appeared in a 1939 production of The Hot Mikado, starring Robinson, in which she played "Little Maid From School" Peep-Bo. She also appeared onstage, mostly as a singer and dancer, in I Had a Ball, Bassa Moona, Marching with Jimmy, Janie, Decision, Three's a Family, Destry Rides Again, and the Off Broadway Double Entry (two one-act musicals showcasing Lenoire: "The Bible Salesman," with a pre-SNL Garrett Morris, and "The Oldest Trick in the World" with Jane Connell).

Amas Repertory Theater
LeNoire championed the cause of racial equity for more than 70 years. Her efforts profoundly influenced the New York theater community. In 1968, using her own savings, LeNoire founded the AMAS Repertory Theatre Company, an interracial theatre dedicated to multi-ethnic productions in New York City. 

With this company, LeNoire created an artistic community where members' individual skills were recognized without regard to race, creed, color, religion, or national origin. She became a successful and groundbreaking Broadway producer. 

The Actors' Equity Association awarded her the first award for helping contribute to the diversification of theatre casting; in 1988, the award was named the Rosetta LeNoire Award.

Amas Repertory Theatre provided a nurturing atmosphere for actors, and a community performing arts center. Throughout its history, many of the company's productions garnered reviews in The New York Times. The long-running theater's cramped headquarters were originally located at 1 East 104th Street, in the uptown neighborhood known as East Harlem. The theater continues today as Amas Musical Theatre, now located midtown on West 52nd Street above Jersey Boys, and carries on LeNoire's dream of diversity in the creative and theatrical arts. Since its inception, Amas has produced over 60 original musicals. Many of them have gone on to Broadway, including Bubbling Brown Sugar, which received a Tony Award nomination in 1976 for Best Musical.

Voice acting
She was the voice of Big Bertha in Ralph Bakshi's animated feature film Fritz the Cat (1972).

Death
On March 17, 2002, LeNoire died at Holy Name Hospital in Teaneck, New Jersey of complications from diabetes, but an article in TV Guide reported that she died of pneumonia. A resident of the Lillian Booth Actors Home in Englewood, New Jersey, she was 90 years old at the time of her death. A Catholic, she was funeralized at St. Frances of Rome Catholic Church in the Bronx.

Legacy
The Rosie Award, named for Rosetta LeNoire, "is given to individuals who demonstrate extraordinary accomplishment and dedication in the theatrical arts and to corporations that work to promote opportunity and diversity", with past honorees including Ossie Davis and Ruby Dee, Geoffrey Holder and Carmen de Lavallade, Leslie Uggams, Maurice Hines, Phylicia Rashad, Woodie King Jr., Dionne Warwick, and George C. Wolfe.

Filmography

References

External links
 
 
 
 

1911 births
2002 deaths
Deaths from pneumonia in New Jersey
Actresses from New York City
American soap opera actresses
United States National Medal of Arts recipients
Burials at Cypress Hills Cemetery
Deaths from diabetes
People from Englewood, New Jersey
African-American actresses
American stage actresses
American voice actresses
20th-century American actresses
People from East Harlem
American people of Dominica descent
American people of Jamaican descent
20th-century African-American women
20th-century African-American people
21st-century African-American people
21st-century African-American women
African-American Catholics